Brong Ahafo United is a Ghanaian football Club, based in Sunyani, currently competing in the Ghana Premier League. It was established in 1960 to bring the people of Bono or Brong and Ahafo together through football. The club is also known as Apostles of power soccer. Their long time regional rival is Bofoakwa Tano, a club based in Sunyani as well. Other known clubs in the region are Aduana Stars(two time GPL champions), Berekum Chelsea, Young Apostles(BA United seed), DC United, Nsoatreman, Wamnafo might Royals, and few other clubs not mentioned. 

Club Legends: 
Godfred Yeboah 

The club competed in the erstwhile Ghana Division One League in zone one 2020-2021 and finished 8th with 37 points.

History
The club was founded on 4 April 1960 as Brong Ahafo United.

Current squad

Former players

 Category:BA Stars F.C. players

References

External links
 Club logo

Football clubs in Ghana
Association football clubs established in 1959
1959 establishments in Ghana